MICAL-like 1, also known as MICALL1, is a human gene.

References

Further reading